Kosmosiphon is a genus of flowering plants belonging to the family Acanthaceae.

Its native range is Western Central Tropical Africa.

Species:
 Kosmosiphon azureus Lindau

References

Acanthaceae
Acanthaceae genera